The men's K-4 500 metres canoe sprint competition at the 2019 European Games in Minsk took place between 25 and 27 June at the Zaslavl Regatta Course.

Schedule
The schedule was as follows:

All times are Further-eastern European Time (UTC+3)

Results

Heats
The fastest three boats in each heat advanced directly to the final. The next four fastest boats in each heat, plus the fastest remaining boat advanced to the semifinal.

Heat 1

Heat 2

Semifinal
The fastest three boats advanced to the final.

Final
Competitors in this final raced for positions 1 to 9, with medals going to the top three.

References

Men's K-4 500 metres